A Sverdrup wave (also known as Poincaré wave, or rotational gravity wave ) is a wave in the ocean, or large lakes, which is affected by gravity and Earth's rotation (see Coriolis effect).

For a non-rotating fluid, shallow water waves are affected only by gravity (see Gravity wave), where the phase velocity of shallow water gravity wave (c) can be noted as 
 

and the group velocity (cg) of shallow water gravity wave can be noted as
  i.e. 

where g is gravity, λ is the wavelength and H is the total depth.

Derivation 
When the fluid is rotating, gravity waves with a long enough wavelength (discussed below) will also be affected by rotational forces. The linearized, shallow-water equations with a constant rotation rate, f0, are 
 
 
 
where u and v are the horizontal velocities and h is the instantaneous height of the free surface. Using Fourier analysis, these equations can be combined to find the dispersion relation for Sverdrup waves:
 

Limiting Cases 
There are two primary modes of interest when considering Poincaré waves:
 Short wave limit  where  is the Rossby radius of deformation. In this limit, the dispersion relation reduces to the solution for a non-rotating gravity wave.
 Long wave limit  which looks like inertial oscillations driven purely by rotational forces.

Solution for the one-dimensional case 
For a wave traveling in one direction, the horizontal velocities are found to be equal to
 
 
This shows that the inclusion of rotation will cause the wave to develop oscillations at 90° to the wave propagation at the opposite phase. In general, these are elliptical orbits that depend on the relative strength of gravity and rotation. In the long wave limit, these are circular orbits characterized by inertial oscillations.

References

See also
Kelvin wave
Rossby wave
Geophysical fluid dynamics
Sverdrup
Harald Sverdrup

Waves